Fore Shoe Company Building, also known as the Washington Shoe Company Building and Kane Dunham & Kraus Shoe Company Building, is a historic shoe factory building located at Washington, Franklin County, Missouri. The original section was built in 1925, and is a two-story, reinforced concrete and wood beam structure sheathed in brick.  A two- and three-story brick addition was built in 1927, and is of steel frame construction. The building features a prominent brick smoke stack and measures approximately 58,000 square feet of floor space.  The factory closed in 1971.

It was listed on the National Register of Historic Places in 2005.

References

Industrial buildings and structures on the National Register of Historic Places in Missouri
Industrial buildings completed in 1925
Buildings and structures in Franklin County, Missouri
National Register of Historic Places in Franklin County, Missouri
Shoe factories